The following is a list of notable events and releases that happened in 2012 in music in the United States.

Notable events

January
7 – Katy Perry's single "The One That Got Away" reaches #1 on the Hot Dance Club Songs chart, making her album, Teenage Dream, the first album in history to have seven songs from the same album reach #1 on the Billboard Hot Dance Club Songs chart. It is also only the third album in history to have six singles from the same album reach the top five on the Billboard Hot 100.
20 – Etta James dies of leukemia at age 73.

February
4 – Adele's single "Set Fire to the Rain" reaches #1 on the Billboard Hot 100 chart, making her album, 21, the first album in history to have three #1 songs from the same album by a British female artist.
5 – During Super Bowl XLVI Kelly Clarkson performs the "National Anthem" and artists Madonna, LMFAO, Nicki Minaj, M.I.A., and Cee Lo Green perform at the halftime show. The twelve-minute performance becomes the most watched television event of all time, gathering a record 118 million viewers, six more than the game itself. Subsequently, "Give Me All Your Luvin'" becomes Madonna's 38th top ten hit and her 41st #1 hit on the dance charts.
11 – Pop icon Whitney Houston is found dead at the age of 48 in her Los Angeles hotel room hours before a pre-Grammy party hosted by Clive Davis. Further investigations reveal cocaine in her system, but the cause of death is ruled as heart disease and drowning. Sales of her albums spike, and "I Will Always Love You" re-enters the top ten of the Billboard Hot 100.
12 – Adele wins six awards at the 54th Annual Grammy Awards for her album 21, including Album of the Year, Song of the Year, and Record of the Year (the latter two for "Rolling in the Deep"). Bon Iver wins Best New Artist. Kanye West and the Foo Fighters swept in their respective categories, with Kanye winning 4 Grammys and the Foo Fighters taking 5.
28 – Terrorizer releases their first album in six years, Hordes of Zombies.
28 – Corrosion of Conformity releases their first album in seven years, Corrosion of Conformity.
29 – Davy Jones of the band The Monkees dies in Florida after suffering a severe heart attack at the age of 66.

March
3 – Adele becomes the first female artist to have three singles in the top ten of the Billboard Hot 100 at the same time, and the first female artist to have two albums in the top five of the Billboard 200 and two singles in the top five of the Billboard Hot 100 simultaneously.
Katy Perry's single "Part of Me" debuts at #1 on the Billboard Hot 100, becoming only the 20th song in history to debut atop the chart. It is her seventh consecutive top five single on the chart.
26 – Madonna releases her twelfth studio album MDNA, which becomes her eighth #1 album on the Billboard 200, debuting with 359,000 copies sold in the second week.
26 – Joan Osborne releases her first album in four years, Bring It on Home.

April
1 – The Academy of Country Music Awards took place in Las Vegas. This was the last year Reba McEntire hosted until 2018.
4 – Justin Bieber's single, "Boyfriend", has the second-highest first week sales of a new single, debuting at #2 on the Billboard Hot 100, later on surpassed by Taylor Swift's "We Are Never Ever Getting Back Together" with 623,000 sales making Bieber the third highest first week sale.
10 – Counting Crows released their first album in four years, Underwater Sunshine (or What We Did on Our Summer Vacation).
26 – Chiodos' original lead singer, Craig Owens, rejoins the band after being let go in September 2009, replacing Brandon Bolmer, who departed Chiodos in March. Drummer Derrick Frost also rejoins the band, replacing Tanner Wayne, who left with Bolmer in March.
28 – Gotye became the first Belgian-Australian solo artist to hit #1 on the Billboard Hot 100 with "Somebody That I Used To Know".
29 – Kevin Richardson rejoined the Backstreet Boys permanently, after roughly six years of departure.

May
1 – Pennywise releases All or Nothing, their first album to feature Ignite singer Zoli Téglás on lead vocals, following the August 2009 departure of original lead singer Jim Lindberg.
4 – Rapper Adam "MCA" Yauch of the Beastie Boys dies of cancer at the age of 47.
8 – Jermaine Paul wins the second season of The Voice. Juliet Simms is named runner-up. Tony Lucca and Chris Mann finishing third and fourth place respectively.
15 – Garbage released their first album in seven years, Not Your Kind of People.
Tenacious D released her first album in six years, Rize of the Fenix.
17 – Donna Summer, known as "The Queen of Disco", dies of cancer at age 63.
20 – The Billboard Music Awards took place at the MGM Grand Garden Arena in Las Vegas
23 – Phillip Phillips is crowned winner of the eleventh season of American Idol while Jessica Sanchez is named runner-up.
29 – Doc Watson dies after complications from abdominal surgery at age 89.

June
5 – Alan Jackson releases Thirty Miles West, his first studio album to be released on his own label, Alan's Country Records, after leaving his longtime label, Arista Nashville.
15 – Justin Bieber tops the charts and goes platinum for the fourth time after the release of his third studio album Believe.

August
1 – No Use for a Name frontman Tony Sly dies at the age of 41 of a drug overdose.
2 – Blink-182 celebrate their 20th anniversary as a band with a worldwide tour simply called 20th Anniversary Tour.
4 – Ministry reunited at the Wacken Open Air festival in Germany.
9 – The Monkees announce that Michael Nesmith rejoined the band for a twelve city tour of the U.S..
12 – Katy Perry's "Wide Awake" peaks at No. 2, becoming her ninth and final Top 10 single from the Teenage Dream era.
28 – TobyMac debuted at No. 1 on the Billboard 200 with his sixth full-length studio album Eye on It. The album was the first Christian release since 1997 to reach No. 1 on the Billboard 200.

September
4 – Matchbox Twenty released their first album in ten years, North.
6 – The MTV Video Music Awards took place at the Staples Center in Los Angeles.
11 – DMX released his first album in six years, Undisputed.
21 – Billie Joe Armstrong of Green Day has a meltdown at the iHeartRadio Festival when the tour promoters cut their performance short to extend time for Usher's performance. During their performance of Basket Case, he decides to stop the song and goes on a profanity-filled rant, even going as to say that he's "not Justin Bieber". Billie then smashes his guitar alongside Mike Dirnt, flips off the officials and throws the microphone. He enters rehab the next day.
25 – No Doubt released their first album in eleven years, Push and Shove.

October
16 – Death Cab for Cutie frontman Ben Gibbard released his solo debut, Former Lives.
22 – Taylor Swift released her anticipated album, Red. The album sold 1,208,000 copies in its first week in the U.S, debuting at number one on the Billboard 200 chart, the second highest debut for a female artist.
30 – The Coup released their first album in six years, Sorry to Bother You.

November
1 – The CMA Awards took place at the Bridgestone Arena in Nashville, Tennessee. Brad Paisley and Carrie Underwood hosted for the fifth year in a row.
19 – Rihanna released her new album Unapologetic, scoring her first #1 album on the US charts.

December
18 – Cassadee Pope wins the third season of The Voice. Terry McDermott is named runner-up. Nicholas David finishing third place.

Bands formed

 3rdeyegirl
 Body/Head
 The Chainsmokers
 Chelsea Light Moving
 The Collective
 Dan + Shay
 Device
 Emblem3
 Fifth Harmony
 Flying Colors
 The Griswolds
 Haim
 Honeyblood
 Magic!
 Milky Chance
 MisterWives
 On An On
 Perfect Pussy
 Preoccupations
 PVRIS
 Rixton
 Slaves
 Union J
 Them Are Us Too
 The Vamps
 The Winery Dogs
 X Ambassadors

Bands reformed

98 Degrees
The Afghan Whigs
At the Drive-In
The Beach Boys (classic lineup)
Black Tambourine (single performance)
Cannibal Ox
Coal Chamber
Desaparecidos
Die Kreuzen
Firehose (tour only)
Garbage
Grandaddy
Jonas Brothers
Matchbox Twenty
The Monkees
I Mother Earth
Nasum
No Doubt
The Obsessed
Phantom Planet 
The Procussions
Refused
The Replacements
SikTh
Treble Charger
Van Halen

Bands on hiatus
Staind

The Black Eyed Peas
Gorillaz
Every Avenue
Foo Fighters
Incubus
Oceano
Rage Against the Machine
Scissor Sisters
She Wants Revenge
Thrice
Thursday
LMFAO
Ludo

Bands disbanded

Beastie Boys
Behind Crimson Eyes
The Books
Buffalo Springfield
The Carrier
Creed
Das Racist
David Crowder Band
Defiance
Diddy-Dirty Money
D.R.U.G.S.
The Dubliners
Girls
Handsome Furs
Hole
INXS
It Dies Today
Jack's Mannequin
Jet
Made Out of Babies
MC5
Meg & Dia
Pretty Ricky
Revis
Rock Bottom Remainders
Selena Gomez & the Scene
Sherwood
Sons and Daughters
A Static Lullaby
This Time Next Year
Vains of Jenna
Ween
Women
WU LYF

Albums released in 2012
List of 2012 albums

January

February

March

April

May

June

July

August

September

October

November

December

Top songs on record

Billboard Hot 100 No. 1 Songs
"Call Me Maybe" – Carly Rae Jepsen (9 weeks)
"Diamonds" – Rihanna (3 weeks)
"Locked Out of Heaven" – Bruno Mars (2 weeks in 2012, 4 weeks in 2013)
"One More Night" – Maroon 5 (9 weeks)
"Part of Me" - Katy Perry (1 week)
"Set Fire to the Rain" – Adele (2 weeks)
"Sexy and I Know It" – LMFAO (2 weeks)
"Somebody That I Used to Know" – Gotye feat. Kimbra (8 weeks)
"Stronger (What Doesn't Kill You)" – Kelly Clarkson (3 weeks)
"We Are Never Ever Getting Back Together" – Taylor Swift (3 weeks)
"We Are Young" – fun. feat. Janelle Monáe (6 weeks)
"We Found Love" – Rihanna feat. Calvin Harris (2 weeks in 2012, 8 weeks in 2011)
"Whistle" – Flo Rida (2 weeks)

Billboard Hot 100 Top 20 Hits
All songs that reached the Top 20 on the Billboard Hot 100 chart during the year, complete with peak chart placement.

Deaths

See also
 2012 in music
 List of 2012 albums
 2012 in heavy metal music
 List of Billboard Hot 100 top 10 singles in 2012

References